Osvaldo Monti (born 6 December 1945) is an Argentine field hockey player. He competed at the 1968 Summer Olympics and the 1972 Summer Olympics.

References

External links
 

1945 births
Living people
Argentine male field hockey players
Olympic field hockey players of Argentina
Field hockey players at the 1968 Summer Olympics
Field hockey players at the 1972 Summer Olympics
Field hockey players from Buenos Aires